Ornis Fennica is a peer-reviewed open access scholarly journal publishing research articles on the ecology, behaviour, biogeography and conservation of birds. It is a journal published by BirdLife Finland. The current editor-in-chief is Suvi Ruuskanen.

Abstracting and indexing 
The journal is abstracted and indexed in:

References

External links 
 

Open access journals
Publications established in 1924
Journals and magazines relating to birding and ornithology